Adelaidia is a genus of beetles in the family Dermestidae, containing the following species:

 Adelaidia haucki Háva, 2000
 Adelaidia rigua Blackburn, 1891
 Adelaidia rufa Háva, 2002
 Adelaidia unicolor Mroczkowski, 1966

References

Dermestidae genera